Henry Doubleday (1810-1902) was an English scientist and horticulturist of Coggeshall in Essex. 

Henry Doubleday was the son of William Doubleday and his wife Hannah Corder. His father was a shopkeeper in Coggeshall; the family were all Quakers. He lived at the same time as his cousin Henry Doubleday (1808-1875) the entomologist and ornithologist.

Doubleday had a wide range of interests, in 1851 he won a bronze medal for lace designs made in Coggeshall and shown at the Great Exhibition. He gained the contract with De La Rue for the supply of gum arabic for postage stamps. Gum arabic is made from imported extracts from the acacia tree: in his efforts to find a suitable material which could be grown in England he experimented with imported varieties of comfrey, though the gum produced proved to be unsuitable.

The value of his work was recognised and he was elected a member of the Royal Horticultural Society, however his membership was never registered as he was unable to afford the fee. The full extent of his work may never be known, as his notes were burnt by his family after his death aged 92 in Coggeshall.

The work was also recognised by Lawrence D Hills, a horticulturalist who named the Henry Doubleday Research Association after him. The HDRA, now called Garden Organic, has since become the largest organic gardening and horticultural organisation in Europe.

References

External links
Garden Organic - formerly the Henry Doubleday Research Association

1810 births
1902 deaths
English scientists
English horticulturists
People educated at Ackworth School
People from Coggeshall
English Quakers
19th-century British scientists
19th-century English people